is a train station on the Hanshin Railway Kōbe Kōsoku Line in Chūō-ku, Kobe, Hyōgo Prefecture, Japan.

Layout
The station has two tracks with two side platforms. Elevator access is only available at the east exit.

History 
The station opened on 7 April 1968.

Damage to the station was caused by the Great Hanshin earthquake in January 1995.

Station numbering was introduced on 1 April 2014.

External links 

 Station website (in Japanese)

References 

Railway stations in Hyōgo Prefecture
Railway stations in Japan opened in 1968